Good Springs is an unincorporated community in Limestone County, Alabama, United States.

Notes

Unincorporated communities in Limestone County, Alabama
Unincorporated communities in Alabama